Helmer Müller (born 11 August 1939 in Sombor, Kingdom of Yugoslavia) is a West German former athlete who competed mainly in the 400 metres.

He competed for West Germany in the 1968 Summer Olympics held in Mexico City, Mexico in the 4 x 400 metre relay where he won the bronze medal with his team mates Manfred Kinder, Gerhard Hennige and Martin Jellinghaus.

References

External links

1939 births
Living people
Sportspeople from Sombor
West German male sprinters
Olympic bronze medalists for West Germany
Athletes (track and field) at the 1968 Summer Olympics
Olympic athletes of West Germany
Medalists at the 1968 Summer Olympics
Olympic bronze medalists in athletics (track and field)
Universiade medalists in athletics (track and field)
Serbian people of German descent
Yugoslav people of German descent
Universiade gold medalists for West Germany
Universiade silver medalists for West Germany
Medalists at the 1967 Summer Universiade